Louisiana Highway 16 (LA 16) is a state highway located in southeastern Louisiana.  It runs  in a general east–west direction from LA 22 south of French Settlement to LA 21 in Sun.

The route makes a wide arc through the Florida Parishes region of the state, traveling east of Baton Rouge and avoiding the urban centers of Hammond and Covington.  However, it passes through a number of the area's smaller towns and communities, such as Denham Springs, Montpelier, Amite City, and Franklinton.  Some but not all of the signage south of Watson still bears north-south directionals rather than the standard east-west. Major junctions along the route include U.S. Highway 190 (US 190) in Denham Springs and Interstate 55 (I-55) in Amite City.

LA 16 was designated in the 1955 Louisiana Highway renumbering, stitched together from six shorter former routes, including State Route 131 south of Denham Springs; State Route 103 between Watson and Amite City; and State Route 35 between Amite City and Franklinton.

Route description
From the west, LA 16 begins at a roundabout with LA 22 just west of Head of Island near the southern tip of Livingston Parish.  After crossing the Amite River, the highway parallels the east bank of the river through the adjacent communities of French Settlement and Port Vincent, where it has a brief concurrency with LA 42.  Continuing northeast, LA 16 follows Pete's Highway across I-12 and into the city of Denham Springs but does not intersect the interstate.  Access is instead provided via the parallel LA 3002 (South Range Avenue).  In the center of town, LA 16 makes a jog west along US 190 (Florida Avenue) before resuming its northward course.  Heading due north from Denham Springs, LA 16 intersects LA 64 near Plainview and proceeds into Watson, where the route's directional banners change from north–south to east–west.  Just before crossing into St. Helena Parish, LA 16 begins a concurrency with LA 63 at Weiss.

In St. Helena Parish, LA 16 begins an eastward trajectory away from the Amite River and splits from LA 63.  The highway travels through Pine Grove and into the village of Montpelier, where it crosses the Tickfaw River and has a short concurrency with both LA 43 and LA 441.  Shortly after crossing into Tangipahoa Parish, LA 16 enters Amite City and passes through an interchange with I-55 at exit 46, connecting with Hammond and Jackson, Mississippi.  LA 16 proceeds through the downtown area and crosses both US 51 (Central Avenue) and the Canadian National Railway (CN) tracks at grade.  East of Amite City, LA 16 crosses the Tangipahoa River and proceeds toward Washington Parish via Holton.

After crossing the Tchefuncte River into Washington Parish, LA 16 curves to the northeast and makes a loop through the city of Franklinton.  This portion of the route overlaps both LA 10 and LA 25 and contains a bridge spanning the Bogue Chitto River that leads onto Washington Street, the city's main east–west thoroughfare.  LA 16 turns south from Washington Street onto Main Street and separates from LA 10 and LA 25.  South of town, LA 16 parallels the Bogue Chitto River and travels southeastward through Enon, where it intersects LA 60.  Near the end of its route, LA 16 enters the northeast corner of St. Tammany Parish and curves due east into the village of Sun.  Here, it reaches its eastern terminus at a junction with LA 21, connecting with Bush to the south and Bogalusa to the north.

History
In the original Louisiana Highway system in use between 1921 and 1955, LA 16 was part of several different routes, including State Route 331 from the western terminus to Port Vincent; State Route 131 to Denham Springs; State Route 337 to Watson; State Route 103 to Amite City; State Route 35 to Franklinton; and State Route 469 to Sun.  These highways were joined together under the single designation of LA 16 when the Louisiana Department of Highways renumbered the state highway system in 1955.

Despite its length, the alignment of LA 16 has remained virtually the same since the 1955 renumbering.  Alterations to the route have been limited to the smoothing of some curves, the replacement of bridges, and the addition of lanes in urban areas.

In 2008, an approximately  stretch of LA 16 in the Denham Springs and Watson areas was widened from two to four lanes.  This was in response to the large amount of daily traffic the area experienced in the past decade.  (Watson was at one time in the early 2000s the largest growing area in the state of Louisiana).

Future
Under this plan of "right-sizing" the state highway system, the portion of LA 16 that follows Pete's Highway on the south side of Denham Springs is proposed for deletion in favor of the parallel LA 3002 as it no longer meets a significant interurban travel function.

Major intersections

See also

References

External links

La DOTD State, District, and Parish Maps

0016
Transportation in Livingston Parish, Louisiana
Transportation in St. Helena Parish, Louisiana
Transportation in Tangipahoa Parish, Louisiana
Transportation in Washington Parish, Louisiana
Transportation in St. Tammany Parish, Louisiana